And the Battle Is Going Again also known as And Lenin Is Young Again is a Soviet patriotic song released in 1974 about the October Revolution and Vladimir Lenin. It was composed by Aleksandra Pakhmutova to lyrics written by her husband Nikolai Dobronravov, with the most known performance of the song being done by Soviet singers Leonid Smetannikov, Joseph Kobzon, and Lev Leshchenko. The song was composed for the closing of the 17th congress of the Komsomol, but shortly after it was performed there it was banned by Soviet censors due to it being heavily influenced by rock music. The song was unbanned a year later, after which it became popular. The song was also performed by Lev Leshchenko at the finals of Pesnya goda in 1975.

The soviet group Grazhdanskaya Oborona has performed the song since 1994 when band leader Yegor Letov was associated with the National Bolshevik Party.

Lyrics

References 

1974 songs
Russian-language songs
Russian songs
Soviet songs
Vladimir Lenin
Works about Vladimir Lenin